The Indian Institute of Forest Management (IIFM), founded 1982, is an autonomous, Natural Resource Service training  institute of  Forestry located in Bhopal, Madhya Pradesh, India, established by the Ministry of Environment, Forest and Climate Change, Government of India with financial assistance from the  Swedish International Development Cooperation Agency (SIDA) and course assistance from the Indian Institute of Management Ahmedabad for mid career training of Indian Forest Service cadre and all State Forest Service cadre in India. The institute's objective is to fulfill the growing need for the managerial human resource in the area of Forest, Environment, and Natural resources Management and allied sectors. The institute is headed by a director selected and appointed by the Ministry of Environment, Forest and Climate Change, Government of India.

IIFM is engaged in education, research, training and consultancy in the area of Forest, Environment and Natural Resources Management and allied sectors. The institute was ranked 8th overall in the country by the Ministry of Human Resource Development, Government of India in the management institutions category under the National Institutional Ranking Framework in its India Rankings 2016. As a campus, IIFM is famous for its rich flora and fauna with sightings of various wild mammals and birds within the campus.

Campus
 

The institute is located in the southernwest corner of the city of Bhopal in the Nehru Nagar locality. It is on a hill that overlooks the Bhadbhada barrage. The barrage controls the overflow of the upper lake or Bada Talab of Bhopal. The spillway for Bhadbhada tails around the IIFM hill, giving it a scenic location surrounded by water on three sides like a peninsula during good monsoons. The location is 3.5 km south of T.T. Nagar and just off the road to Kerwa Dam.

The institute's buildings are designed by Anant Raje. The architecture of the campus is inspired by the historical town of Mandu.

Academics

Academic programmes
IIFM conducts following courses:
 Post Graduate Diploma in Forest Management (PFM)
 Post Graduate Diploma in Sustainability Management (PSM)
 Fellow Program in Management (FPM) equivalent to Ph.Dand
 Ph.D. Programme of FRI Deemed University
 Certificate Course on Chartered Foresters (C3F)

The PFM course is the flagship course of IIFM and is one of its kind in Asia.

In addition to the above courses, it conducts Management Development programmes.

Post Graduate Diploma in Forest Management (PFM)
The PFM course was started in 1988. It is a two-year residential course. The first batch of PFM students graduated in 1990. It is equivalent to Master's Degree in Forest Management. 

IIFM uses the scores of Common Admission Test (CAT) conducted by Indian Institutes of Management and the Xavier Aptitude Test (XAT) conducted by the XLRI to shortlist the candidates for the Written Aptitude Test and the Personal Interview. The shortlisted candidates are required to submit a Statement of Purpose (SOP) on why they want to pursue the PFM course at IIFM. After conducting the Written Aptitude Test and the Personal Interview the institute announces the final list of candidates provisionally selected for the course.

Placement
Most of the job placements at IIFM are with the environment and development sector with NGOs, though recently a number of banks and microfinance institutions have participated in campus placements. Apart from it corporate also participate in IIFM placements and profiles are offered in sales and marketing, market research, banking and finance, environment, health and safety, environment management system, consulting roles, operations etc. with an average package of 6.93 lacs per annum in academic year 2017-2018.

IIFM and its alumni work closely with national and international civil society, governments, academia and industry.

See also
Arid Forest Research Institute (AFRI)
Indian Forest Service (IFS)
Wildlife Institute of India (WII)
List of Environment and Forest Research Institutes in India
Forest Research Institute (India)
Forest Survey of India
Van Vigyan Kendra (VVK) Forest Science Centres

References

Indian Council of Forestry Research and Education
Universities and colleges in Madhya Pradesh
Universities and colleges in Bhopal
Business schools in Madhya Pradesh
Forestry education in India
Ministry of Environment, Forest and Climate Change
1982 establishments in Madhya Pradesh